The Cavendish Professorship is one of the senior faculty positions in physics at the University of Cambridge. It was founded on 9 February 1871 alongside the famous Cavendish Laboratory, which was completed three years later. William Cavendish, 7th Duke of Devonshire endowed both the professorship and laboratory in honor of his relative, chemist and physicist Henry Cavendish.

History

Creation of the Cavendish Laboratory

Before the middle of the nineteenth century, science was largely pursued by individuals, either wealthy amateurs or academics working in their college accommodation. In 1869, a committee formed by the Senate reported that creating a dedicated Laboratory and Professorship would cost £6,300. The then chancellor of the university, William Cavendish met that cost privately 18 months later, and named the department in honor of his relative, the 18th century natural philosopher Henry Cavendish.

James Clerk Maxwell
The first Cavendish Professor was the then relatively obscure James Clerk Maxwell, who had yet to complete the work that would make him the most renowned physicist of the nineteenth century. His appointment was announced on 8 March 1871, and despite initial disappointment at his being offered the place, his inaugural lecture was looked forward to by his likely students as well as his future colleagues. However, it was poorly advertised, so it was only to his students that he laid out his plans for physics at Cambridge. When Maxwell began the actual course a few days later with a lecture on heat, it was attended by academics in formal dress, in the belief that it was the first lecture. Maxwell spent the next three years supervising the construction of the dedicated Cavendish Laboratory, and published in 1873 A Treatise on Electricity and Magnetism. Maxwell's health deteriorated a short time into his tenure, and he died in 1879, aged 48.

Lord Rayleigh
Lord Rayleigh replaced Maxwell immediately upon his death, being universally agreed upon as the only successor. Raleigh spent £1500 updating the laboratory, and created a new practical course, revolutionising practical instruction, and in 1882 he allowed women to take the course as well. In his five years as Cavendish Professor, he published 50 papers and expanded the number of students to 48.

J. J. Thomson
J. J. Thomson was made Cavendish Professor in 1884 at the age of 28, leading one senior member of the University to comment that "Matters have come to a pretty pass when they elect mere boys Professors." In 1895, a change was made to the university regulations which allowed students who had not studied at Cambridge to receive a B.A. by submitting a thesis which was judged "of distinction as a record of original research." Among the students attracted by this change was future Cavendish Professor Ernest Rutherford. Whilst Thomson was Cavendish Professor, he discovered the electron and the existence of isotopes, and also fostered an atmosphere of friendliness and mutual helpfulness.

Ernest Rutherford
Rutherford returned to Cambridge in 1918, and spent the last 19 years of his life there. This was around the time of the change from classical to modern physics, and Rutherford was something of a contradiction, dressing as a Victorian gentleman but working on the cutting edge of physics. Rutherford died suddenly in 1937, marking the end of an era for the Cavendish.

William Lawrence Bragg
Sir Lawrence Bragg became Cavendish Professor just before the outbreak of the Second World War, which resulted in many staff joining various defence research establishments, notably to develop radar. Work on neutron physics performed at this time was translated into the Manhattan Project to build an atom bomb.

Nevill Francis Mott
In 1971 it was renamed from the "Cavendish Professorship of Experimental Physics" to the "Cavendish Professorship of Physics".

Until Brian Pippard became the Cavendish Professor in 1971, the holder was also the head of the Physics Department.

List of Cavendish Professors
There have been nine Cavendish Professors since its inception:

 James Clerk Maxwell (1871–1879)
 Lord Rayleigh (1879–1884)
 J. J. Thomson (1884–1919)
 Ernest Rutherford (1919–1937)
 William Lawrence Bragg (1938–1953)
 Nevill Francis Mott (1954–1971)
 Brian Pippard (1971–1984)
 Sam Edwards (1984–1995)
 Richard Friend (1995–2020)
 Vacant (2020–present)

References

Physics, Cavendish
Cavendish Laboratory
1871 establishments in England
Physics, Cavendish